The Iranian government has 19 ministries.  Their names and website are given in the table below

References

Government ministries of Iran
Government of the Islamic Republic of Iran